Roberto Vilar Fernández (born 1971) is a Galician comedian, television presenter and actor.

Vilar started his television career as part of the comedy duo of Os Tonechos, a sketch show on the late-night variety show Luar. The success of the segment led to his own late-night sketch and variety show Land Rober.

In 2011 Vilar made the move from the regional television network, CRTVG, to a national one, when he was offered a contract by Mediaset España to host the game show Salta a la vista on Cuatro.

In 2014, Vilar hosted the twelfth annual Mestre Mateo Awards.

References

External links
 

1971 births
Living people
21st-century Spanish male actors
People from Galicia (Spain)
Spanish male film actors
Spanish male television actors
Spanish comedians
Spanish male comedians
Spanish stand-up comedians
Spanish television presenters